Sabih Taher Darwish al-Masri is a Jordanian-Palestinian businessman. He is the founder and chairman of Arab Supply and Trading Company (Astra Group).  He is also the chairman of Zara Investment Holding, Astra Industries, Paltel Corporation and Arab Bank, and a founder of the Palestine Securities Exchange (PSE).

He is the cousin of Munib al-Masri.

Al-Masri has a degree in Chemical Engineering from the University of Texas.

Al-Masri co-founded Zara Investment Holding in 1994.

References

Chemical engineers
Living people
Palestinian businesspeople
People from Nablus
People from Ramallah
Year of birth missing (living people)